The second season of The Voice + premiered on TV Globo on January 17, 2021 in the  (BRT / AMT) daytime slot.

On April 3, 2022, 61 year-old Vera de Maria Maga from Team Toni Garrido won the competition with 34.86% of the final vote over Dionisya Moreira (Team Brown), Marcília de Queiroz (Team Fafá) and Maurício Gasperini (Team Ludmilla).

Teams
 Key

Blind auditions
Key

Showdowns

In this phase of the competition, each of the coaches will split the team into three groups of four artists. Two will advance to the Playoffs, while the remaining two can still be stolen by other coaches. Each coach can steal two artists from other teams.

Playoffs

Final show

Round 1: Semifinals

Round 2: Finals

Elimination chart
Key

Results

Ratings and reception

Brazilian ratings
All numbers are in points and provided by Kantar Ibope Media.

References

External links
The Voice + on Gshow.com

+ 2
2022 Brazilian television seasons